Svelviksposten (The Svelvik Gazette) is a local Norwegian newspaper published once a week in the municipality of Svelvik in Vestfold county.

Circulation
According to the Norwegian Audit Bureau of Circulations and National Association of Local Newspapers, Svelviksposten has had the following annual circulation:
 2006: 2,651
 2007: 2,554
 2008: 2,518
 2009: 2,525
 2010: 2,515
 2011: 2,392
 2012: 2,348
 2013: 2,309
 2014: 2,250
 2015: 2,090
 2016: 2,127
 2017: 2 112:

References

External links
Svelviksposten homepage

Newspapers published in Norway
Norwegian-language newspapers
Svelvik
Mass media in Vestfold
Publications established in 1983
1983 establishments in Norway